The 1938 Tour de France was the 32nd edition of the Tour de France, one of cycling's Grand Tours. The Tour began in Paris with a flat stage on 5 July, and Stage 11 occurred on 18 July with a flat stage from Montpellier. The race finished in Paris on 31 July.

Stage 11
18 July 1938 - Montpellier to Marseille,

Stage 12
19 July 1938 - Marseille to Cannes,

Rest day 4
20 July 1938 - Cannes

Stage 13
21 July 1938 - Cannes to Digne,

Stage 14
22 July 1938 - Digne to Briançon,

Stage 15
23 July 1938 - Briançon to Aix-les-Bains,

Rest day 5
24 July 1938 - Aix-les-Bains

Stage 16
25 July 1938 - Aix-les-Bains to Besançon,

Stage 17a
26 July 1938 - Besançon to Belfort,

Stage 17b
26 July 1938 - Belfort to Strasbourg,

Stage 18
27 July 1938 - Strasbourg to Metz,

Stage 19
28 July 1938 - Metz to Reims,

Rest day 6
29 July 1938 - Reims

Stage 20a
30 July 1938 - Reims to Laon,

Stage 20b
30 July 1938 - Laon to Saint-Quentin,  (ITT)

Stage 20c
30 July 1938 - Saint-Quentin to Lille,

Stage 21
31 July 1938 - Lille to Paris,

References

1938 Tour de France
Tour de France stages